Julie Harhart (born August 7, 1945) represented the 183rd Legislative District in the Pennsylvania House of Representatives, United States from 1994 to 2016. She was the Republican Chairman of the House Local Government Committee and a member of the House Professional Licensure Committee.

Career
Prior to her election to the House, Harhart was a legislative aide.

Personal
Harhart is a 1963 graduate of Allentown Central Catholic High School and graduated from Bethlehem Business School in 1965.

She and her husband reside in North Catasauqua, Pennsylvania.

References

External links
Representative Harhart's site Representative Julie Harhart's official web site
Pennsylvania House Republican Caucus Pennsylvania House Republican Caucus site

1945 births
Living people
Republican Party members of the Pennsylvania House of Representatives
Women state legislators in Pennsylvania
21st-century American politicians
21st-century American women politicians
People from Northampton, Pennsylvania